Cyprus has a thriving radio landscape, with 93% of Greek Cypriots tuning in every day. Most stations broadcast in FM, and there's a mixture of state and private-run stations. This article lists all radio stations broadcasting in the southern part of Cyprus and overviews the major stations broadcasting from the part of Cyprus under Turkish Occupation. The British sovereign military bases of Akrotiri and Dhekelia also operate radio transmitters. In addition to domestic broadcasts, Cyprus hosts international broadcast centres beaming content to the Middle East.

Republic of Cyprus

Public stations
The Cyprus Broadcasting Corporation charter mandates a diverse radio programme with national coverage. It currently produces 4 radio programmes. The table below only includes high-power transmitters and omits low-power transmitters that serve as gap-fillers for areas with difficult reception.

Private stations

National coverage

Local coverage

Nicosia

Limassol

Larnaca
Stations broadcasting in the Larnaca District usually can be received in Famagusta as well.

Paphos

Famagusta

International broadcasters
Four medium wave stations broadcast to the Middle East from Cyprus. The BBC Arabic service transmitter is located at Zygi, Limassol. Another BBC MW transmitter is located within the area of the sovereign bases. The rest broadcast from Cape Greco, Famagusta. Although not the target audience, all stations can be received from within Cyprus.

Akrotiri and Dhekelia
Two FM radio stations broadcast from the Eastern and Western Sovereign Base Areas and through relays in areas controlled by the Republic of Cyprus, operated by the British Forces Broadcasting Service.

Occupied Cyprus

Public stations
When Turkish Cypriots withdrew from all official positions in the Republic of Cyprus in the aftermath of the Cypriot intercommunal violence, Bayrak assumed the role of the public broadcaster for the Turkish Cypriot enclaves first, and occupied Cyprus after 1974. It currently produces six radio programmes on FM while Turkey's public broadcaster TRT emits in Northern Cyprus via Radyo 1 and Radyo 2, and also the radio station of the Presidency of Religious Affairs of Turkey called Diyanet Radyo.

Private stations

Defunct stations
British East Mediterranean Relay Station
National Radio 1

References

Lists of mass media in Cyprus
Radio stations in Cyprus
Cyprus